Jump on It may refer to:
 Jump on It (Montrose album),  1976 album by hard rock band Montrose
 Jump on It!, 1981 song by rap group The Sugarhill Gang
 "Jump on It," a song from Sir Mix-a-Lot's 1996 album Return of the Bumpasaurus
 Jump on It, 2023 album by Bill Orcutt